Vladimir Vasilyevich Pomeshchikov (born December 27, 1956) is a Russian professional football coach and a former player. As of July 2009, he works as an assistant coach with FC Tom Tomsk.

References

1956 births
Living people
Soviet footballers
FC Tom Tomsk players
Russian football managers
FC Tom Tomsk managers

Association football utility players